Atagema spongiosa is a species of sea slug or dorid nudibranch, a marine gastropod mollusk in the family Discodorididae.

Distribution
This species was described from Sri Lanka. It is reported to be widespread in the tropical Indo-West Pacific Ocean.

References

Discodorididae
Molluscs of the Indian Ocean
Molluscs of the Pacific Ocean
Gastropods described in 1858
Taxa named by Edward Frederick Kelaart